These are the official results of the Men's 20 km walk event at the 1982 European Championships in Athens, Greece, held on 7 September 1982.

Medalists

Results

Final
7 September

Participation
According to an unofficial count, 21 athletes from 13 countries participated in the event.

 (2)
 (1)
 (1)
 (1)
 (2)
 (1)
 (3)
 (1)
 (2)
 (1)
 (3)
 (2)
 (1)

See also
 1980 Men's Olympic 20km Walk (Moscow)
 1983 Men's World Championships 20km Walk (Helsinki)
 1984 Men's Olympic 20km Walk (Los Angeles)
 1987 Men's World Championships 20km Walk (Rome)
 1988 Men's Olympic 20km Walk (Seoul)

References

 Results

20 kilometres race walk
Racewalking at the European Athletics Championships